"J'attends l'amour" (English: "'I'm Waiting for Love") is a 2002 song recorded by the French artist Jenifer Bartoli. Released in April 2002, it was her debut single, from her eponymous album, Jenifer. This song was a great success in France and Belgium (Wallonia).

Song information
This song is actually a French-language adaptation of Johanna Demker's song "True Love". The music video was shot in London, and shows the singer walking in the streets.

The song features on many French compilations, such as Best Of France 2002 and Now! Hits Référence Vol. 2. It was also available on the Star Academy's albums, Les Singles and Le Live. The song was included on Jenifer's live album Jénifer fait son live, as the 17th track.

In February 2007, the song was also released in the U.S. at the same time as the album Jenifer.

The song went straight to number two on the French Singles Chart, on 20 April 2002, and was unable to dislodge Shakira's "Whenever, Wherever". Then it almost did not stop to drop the following weeks, totalling seven weeks in the top ten, 12 weeks in the top 50 and 19 weeks in the top 100. It achieved Gold status and ranked 30th on the End of the Year Chart.

The single charted for 13 weeks in Belgium (Wallonia), from 27 April 2002. It started at number eight, then climbed to number two, just behind her former candidate of the Star Academy 1, Jean-Pascal Lacoste, with his single "L'Agitateur". Then it dropped on the chart and remained for eight weeks in the top ten. It was certified Gold disc and features at number 14 on the Annual Chart.

Track listings
 CD single
 "J'attends l'amour" — 3:39
 "Viens me voir" (Yorgos Benardos/Ingrid Roux) — 3:25

 Digital download
 "J'attends l'amour" — 3:39
 "J'attends l'amour" (2005 live version) — 4:15

Personnel
Benjamin Raffaëlli: guitar
Nicolas Neidhardt: keyboards & programming
Laurent Vernerey: bass guitar
Christophe Deschamps: drums & percussion
Guillaume Eyango: backing vocals
Murielle Lefebvre: backing vocals
Laurent Marimbert: string arrangement & conducting ("J'attends l'amour")
Bertrand Cervera: violin solo ("J'attends l'amour")
Cyrille Lacrouts: cello solo ("J'attends l'amour")
Michel Sedan: photography

Charts and sales

Weekly charts

Year-end charts

Certifications

References

External links
 "J'attends l'amour", lyrics and music video

2002 debut singles
Jenifer (singer) songs
2002 songs
Island Records singles